Martha, also known as The Martha Stewart Show, is an American cooking show hosted by Martha Stewart. The series premiered on September 12, 2005, in syndication until it was picked up by the Hallmark Channel in September 2010 as part of a larger deal that turned over most of the cable network's daytime schedule to shows from Stewart's production company, MSLO Productions. It followed her previous syndicated show Martha Stewart Living that ran from 1993–2004.  Unlike the previous show, Martha  was taped before a studio audience at the Chelsea Studios in New York City, New York. It was distributed by NBC Universal Television Distribution in partnership with MSLO Productions. The series' production company came to a consensus with Hallmark to end Martha due to the rising costs. The last episode was shot on April 24, 2012, with it airing on May 11, 2012.

The syndicated broadcasts aired Monday through Friday at various times on broadcasting markets. Reruns also aired on Fine Living Network prior to the channels transformation into the Cooking Channel. On Hallmark, the series also aired Monday through Friday but at the same time of 10:00 am EST.

Synopsis
Each episode includes several segments related to cooking, crafts, gardening, interior design, and other topics related to arts and crafts. The program also features celebrity guests.

References

External links
 

2000s American cooking television series
2010s American cooking television series
2000s American television talk shows
2010s American television talk shows
2005 American television series debuts
2012 American television series endings
First-run syndicated television programs in the United States
Television series by Fremantle (company)
Television series by Universal Television
English-language television shows
Gardening television
Martha Stewart Living Omnimedia